William Herbert Threadgold (c. 1885 - 3 September 1946) was an Australian politician who represented the South Australian House of Assembly multi-member seat of Port Pirie from 1937 to 1938 for the Labor Party.

References

 

1946 deaths
Members of the South Australian House of Assembly
Year of birth uncertain